The Avenging Arrow is a 1921 American silent Western film serial directed by William J. Bowman and W. S. Van Dyke. Its 15 episodes are now considered to be lost.

Episodes
Fifteen episodes of The Avenging Arrow were released weekly from March 13 to June 19, 1921:

“The Vow of Mystery”
“The Enemy Strikes”
“The Hands”
“A Life in Jeopardy”
“The Message Stone”
“The Midnight Attack”
“The Double Game”
“The Strange Pact”
“The Auction Block”
“Outwitted”
“Dangerous Waters”
“The House of Treachery”
“On Perilous Grounds”
“Shifting Sands”
“The Toll of the Desert”

Cast
 Ruth Roland as Anita Delgado
 Edward Hearn as Ralph Troy
 Virginia Ainsworth as Luiza Traganza
 S.E. Jennings as Don Jose Delgado
 William Steele as Don Carlos Martinez
 Chief "Big Tree" as Modoc
 Frank Lackteen as Pablo
 James Robert Chandler as The Hermit (as Robert Chandler)
 Otto Lederer as Joaquin Ruiz
 Vera Sisson as White Faun

See also
 List of American films of 1921
 List of film serials
 List of film serials by studio
 List of lost films

References

External links
 

1921 films
1921 lost films
1921 Western (genre) films
American black-and-white films
American silent serial films
Films directed by W. S. Van Dyke
Lost Western (genre) films
Lost American films
Pathé Exchange film serials
Silent American Western (genre) films
1920s American films
1920s English-language films
Silent adventure films
Silent thriller films